The following films are to be shown at the 2009 Sundance Film Festival.

Documentary Competition
Art & Copy 
Boy Interrupted
The Cove 
Crude  
Dirt! The Movie 
El General 
Good Hair 
Over the Hills and Far Away 
The Reckoning 
Reporter 
The September Issue
Sergio 
Shouting Fire: Stories from the Edge of Free Speech 
We Live in Public 
When You're Strange 
William Kunstler: Disturbing the Universe

U.S. Dramatic Competition
Adam 
Amreeka 
Arlen Faber
Big Fan 
Brief Interviews with Hideous Men  
Cold Souls 
Dare
Don't Let Me Drown 
The Greatest 
Humpday 
Paper Heart 
Peter and Vandy 
Precious 
Sin Nombre 
Taking Chance 
Toe to Toe

World Cinema Documentary
211:Anna
Afghan Star
Big River Man
Burma VJ
The End of the Line
The Glass House
Kimjongilia
Let's Make Money
Nollywood Babylon
Old Partner
Prom Night in Mississippi
The Queen and I 
Quest for Honor
Rough Aunties
Thriller in Manila
Tibet in Song

World Cinema Dramatic Competition
Before Tomorrow (Le Jour avant le lendemain) — Marie-Hélène Cousineau, Madeline Ivalu (Canada)
Bronson 
Carmo, Hit the Road 
The Clone Returns Home (Kuron Wa Kokyo-Wo Mezasu)
Dada's Dance 
An Education
Lost Village
Five Minutes of Heaven 
A French Gigolo (Cliente) 
Heart of Time (Corazon Del Tiempo)
Louise-Michel
from within
Lulu and Jim (Lulu und Jimi)
The Maid (La Nana)
One Day in a Life (Un Altro Pianeta)
Unmade Beds
Victoria Day — David Bezmozgis (Canada)
Zion and His Brother

Premieres
Adventureland
Brooklyn's Finest
Earth Days
Endgame
500 Days of Summer
I Love You Phillip Morris
The Informers
In the Loop
Manure
Mary and Max
The Messenger
Moon
Motherhood 
Mystery Team
Peter and Vandy
Rudo y Cursi
Shrink
Spread
The Winning Season
Zion and His Brother

Spectrum
Against the Current
The Anarchist's Wife
Barking Water
Children of Invention
Everything Strange and New
Helen
The Immaculate Conception of Little Dizzle
Johnny Mad Dog
La Mission
Lymelife
The Missing Person
Once More With Feeling
The Only Good Indian
Pomegranates and Myrrh
The Vicious Kind
World's Greatest Dad

Documentary Spotlight
It Might Get Loud
No Impact Man
Passing Strange
Tyson
Why We Laugh: Black Comedians on Black Comedy
Wounded Knee
The Yes Men Fix the World

Park City at Midnight
Black Dynamite
The Carter
Dead Snow
Grace
The Killing Room
Mystery Team
Spring Breakdown
White Lightnin'

Frontier
Artist Spotlight: The Works of Maria Marshall
Lunch Break/Exit
O'er the Land
Stay the Same Never Change
Stingray Sam
Where Is Where?
You Won't Miss Me

References

External links
IMDB: SFF (85-09)

Sundance 2009
2009 films
2009 in American cinema
2009-related lists